As a major port a number of fireboats of San Francisco have been operated by the city of San Francisco since 1878.

These vessels were not operated by the San Francisco Fire Department, which did not have any active fireboats at the time of the disaster.

References

External links
 

San Francisco
Government of San Francisco